Leigh Lisker (December 7, 1918 – March 24, 2006) was an eminent American linguist and phonetician. Most of his career was spent at the University of Pennsylvania, where he was a professor and then emeritus professor of linguistics. Dr. Lisker received his A.B. in 1941, with a major in German, his M.A. in 1946, and a Ph.D. in 1949 in linguistics. He was a major figure in phonetics, working both at the University of Pennsylvania and at Haskins Laboratories in New Haven, CT, where he was a senior scientist from 1951 until the end of his life. He collaborated with several phoneticians, principally Arthur S. Abramson. He is best known for his work, done mostly in conjunction with Abramson, on voice onset time. Dr. Lisker also made important contributions to Dravidian linguistics, including the book Introduction to Spoken Telugu (Telugu), and did research comparing phonetic and phonological perceptions on the part of linguistically naive and linguistically sophisticated speakers of different native language backgrounds. He conducted such studies in collaboration with Dr. Abramson of the University of Connecticut, Bh. Krishnamurti  of University of Hyderabad, India, Adrian Fourcin  of University College London, and Mario Rossi  of the Institut de Phonétique at the Université de Provence, Aix-en-Provence.

External links
 Haskins Leigh Lisker Tribute site
 Reprints of many Lisker's papers at Haskins Labs website
 University of Pennsylvania Almanac obituary
 comments on Leigh Lisker by Arthur Abramson

Selected publications

 Lisker, L. Minimal cues for separating /w,r,l,y/ in intervocalic position. Word, 1957, 13, 257-267.
 Lisker, L. Linguistic segments, acoustic segments and synthetic speech. Language, 1957, 33, 370-374.
 Lisker, L., Cooper, F.S., & Liberman, A.M. The uses of experiment in language description. Word, 1962, 18, 82-106.
 Lisker, L. & Abramson, A.S. A cross-language study of voicing in initial stops: acoustical measurements. Word, 1964, 20, 384-422.
 Lisker, L. & Abramson, A.S. Distinctive features and laryngeal control. Language, 1971, 47, 767-785.
 Lisker, L. On time and timing in speech. In T.A. Sebeok (Ed.), Current Trends in Linguistics, Vol. 12, The Hague: Mouton, 1974, 2387-2418.
 Lisker, L. The pursuit of invariance in speech signals. JASA, 1985, 77, 1199-1202.
 Lisker, L. "Voicing" in English: A catalogue of acoustic features signaling /b/ versus /p/ in trochees. Language and Speech, 1986, 29, 3-11.

1918 births
2006 deaths
Linguists from the United States
Haskins Laboratories scientists
University of Pennsylvania alumni
University of Pennsylvania faculty
20th-century linguists